Play Dirty is a thriller novel written by Sandra Brown in 2007. According to WorldCat, the book was held in more than 2500 libraries as of February, 2014.

Plot 

The book tells the story of Griff Burkett, a football fallen star, who was caught cheating and was sent to prison. After five years, Burkett is a free man. He meets Foster and Laura Speakman, a wealthy and successful but childless couple. They hire Burkett to do a secret job, but then is suspected of an unsolved murder by his long-time nemesis, detective Stanley Rodarte. Burkett tries to prove his innocence and save the people they care about the most. The narrative contains a lot of sexual content. The book was published by Ricochet in 2006 and later by Simon & Schuster.

Characters 
Griff Burkett is a convicted former football player who has just got out of prison. He has been sent to prison after he was caught cheating. He is the male protagonist.
Foster Speakman is a very successful and wealthy businessman. He is the owner of SunSouth Airline company.
Laura Speakman is Foster Speakman's wife and the female protagonist.
 Stanley Rodarte is a corrupted police detective. He is Burkett's nemesis.

Reception
Reviews of the book vary from "solid thriller" (Kirkus) to "disappointing" (Washburn Review)

References and resources

External links 
Sandra Brown's official homepage
'Play Dirty' official homepage

American thriller novels
American romance novels
2007 American novels
Contemporary romance novels